Samuel Salter (born August 9, 2000) is a Canadian professional soccer player who plays as a forward for Atlético Ottawa in the Canadian Premier League.

Early life
Salter played in the Montreal Impact Academy from 2013 until 2016. Afterwards, he played with CS Étoiles de l'Est. In high school, he attended the ecole secondaire Antoine de Saint-Exupery where he was coached by Sandro Grande. He played for the Quebec provincial team, helping them to win a national bronze in 2017. In 2018, he moved to France to join ASPTT Dijon in France's top U19 league. He also had a two-week trial with the U19 team of RC Lens.

College career
After graduating high school, he attended Dawson College in Quebec, in 2017, where he was the CCAA - ACSC Men's Soccer All-Canadian for the 2017, the RSEQ Rookie of the Year, Player of the Year and led the conference in scoring with nine goals in nine games. He was named the school's Athlete of the Year.
 
In 2019, he decided to attend California State University, Northridge in the United States, playing for the men's soccer team. He scored two goals, including the game-winning goal, in his debut on August 30, 2019, in the season opener against the Ohio State Buckeyes. earning him Big West Conference Freshman of the Week honours. At the end of the season, he was named to the Big West All-Freshman Team.

Club career
In 2018, he played for CS St-Hubert in the Première ligue de soccer du Québec. 

In 2020, he returned to the PLSQ, playing with AS Blainville, helping them to the league title and finishing as the league's leading scorer, including two hat-tricks in back-to-back games.

In February 2021, Salter signed a one-year contract with club options for 2022 and 2023 with Canadian Premier League side HFX Wanderers. He scored his first professional goal on July 17 against Cavalry FC. In January 2022, HFX announced they had exercised Salter's contract option, keeping him at the club for the upcoming season.

On February 16, 2023, he joined Atlético Ottawa, for an undisclosed transfer fee, in the league's first ever intra-league transfer involving a fee on a two year deal, with a club option for 2025.

Career statistics

References

2000 births
Association football forwards
Canadian soccer players
Soccer people from Quebec
HFX Wanderers FC players
Première ligue de soccer du Québec players
Canadian Premier League players
Dawson College alumni
Cal State Northridge Matadors men's soccer players
Living people
Canadian expatriate soccer players
Expatriate soccer players in the United States
Canadian expatriate sportspeople in the United States
A.S. Blainville players
CS St-Hubert players